Hit Me Up may refer to:

 "Hit Me Up" (Danny Fernandes song), 2011
 "Hit Me Up" (Gia Farrell song), 2006
 "Hit Me Up", a 2019 song by Omar Apollo featuring Dominic Fike and Kenny Beats
 "Hit Me Up", a 2007 song by Reyez featuring Pitbull
 "Hit Me Up", a 2019 song by Stefflon Don

See also 
"Hit 'Em Up", song by 2Pac featuring Outlawz